Asha Puthli is a singer-songwriter, producer, and actress born on February 4, 1945, and raised in Bombay, India. She has recorded solo albums for EMI, CBS/Sony, and RCA.  Her recordings cover blues, pop, rock, soul, funk, disco, and techno and have been produced by Del Newman  and Teo Macero.

Early life
Puthli was born into a Hindu family. She is a niece of Kamaladevi Chattopadhyay. Her father was a businessman, and her mother was a homemaker. Like many upper middle class Hindu children at the time, she attended English-speaking Catholic schools.

Puthli began training at an early age in Indian classical music and opera. She listened to jazz and pop music on the radio, which led to her interest in fusion. At thirteen she won a contest in which she sang "Malagueña". The victory encouraged her to begin improvising with a jazz band at local tea dances. Ved Mehta described her singing in his book Portrait of India. She went to a university in Mumbai.

Music career
After receiving her degree, Puthli worked as a British Airways flight attendant. For her training, she spent two months in London where she later recalled she "would get to hear real jazz". While vacationing in America, she auditioned for a dance scholarship from Martha Graham, which she received. She resigned from British Airways and relocated to New York. John H. Hammond at Columbia had read Ved Mehta's portrait of her in Jazz in Bombay. After hearing a rough demo, he signed her to CBS Records. She sang lead vocals on the Peter Ivers Blues Band's cover version of "Ain't That Peculiar" which was reviewed favorably in  Cashbox, Rolling Stone, and Billboard. The single released in 1971 entered the Billboard charts. But Take It Out On Me, the band's album featuring Puthli, was finally released in 2009.

Hammond sent her to audition for avant-garde jazz saxophonist Ornette Coleman, who was looking for a singer for his album Science Fiction (1971). For the album, Puthli sang on two songs, "What Reason Could I Give" and "All My Life". For her work on Science Fiction, she shared the Downbeat Critics' Poll award for Best Female Jazz Vocalist.

Puthli's popularity grew not in the U.S. but in Europe where she signed a record deal with CBS. Her solo albums reflected her interest in pop, rock, soul, funk and disco. She gravitated toward the glam world of Elton John and T. Rex. Her self-titled debut was produced by Del Newman, and it included cover versions of songs by JJ Cale and Bill Withers. She hired Pierre LaRoche (makeup designer for David Bowie and Freddie Mercury) and photographer Mick Rock to shoot the cover. The album included a disco version of "I Am a Song" by Neil Sedaka.

Film and fashion
Her first film was  short with Indian director Mani Kaul in 1968. During the 1970s, Puthli starred in lead roles in Merchant Ivory's Savages which was screened at the 1972 Cannes Film Festival and Bruno Corbucci's The Gang That Sold America (Italian title:Squadra Antigangsters). She also appeared in a Louis Malle
cinema verite film as “Nadja” based on Andre Breton’s novel, and German documentary “Reden it’s mien Drouge “ for Norddeutscher Rundfunk NDR on her life.
Her sense of fashion brought her visibility. A headliner at Studio 54, she was dressed by designers Michaele Vollbracht and Manolo Blahnik and photographed by Richard Avedon, Andy Warhol and appears in the center fold of Francesco Scavullo's book of photographs 1948-1964. 

In the twenty-first century, she sang on  Asana Vol. 3 by  Bill Laswell and Hey Diwani, Hey Diwani by Dum Dum Project. In 2005, she returned to the UK charts with "Looking Glass" from the album Fear of Magnetism by Stratus.

Her song "Space Talk" from the 1970s, a popular tune with David Mancuso's The Loft crowd, has been sampled by P.Diddy, The Notorious B.I.G., Dilated Peoples, Governor featuring 50 Cent, and Redman; and her cover of George Harrison's "I Dig Love" was sampled in 2005 for the chart-topping track "Reload It" by UK Mobo award winner Kano. She has co-writer credits with Jay-Z, P.Diddy, The Neptunes, Jermaine Dupri, SWV, and The Notorious B.I.G. on the track "The World is Filled" from the multi-platinum album, Life After Death.

In August 2006, she headlined Central Park Summerstage in New York City on an eclectic bill with DJ Spooky, Talvin Singh, Outernational, and Prefuse 73, and special guests Dewey Redman and Dres (rapper) of the hip-hop group Black Sheep.

Praise by critics
Music critic Ann Powers in The New York Times called Puthli a "fusion pioneer". Music critic Robert Palmer called her singing "extraordinary". Her third solo album, The Devil is Loose, was called an instant classic by The New York Times. Thom Jurek of AllMusic called it " a masterpiece of snakey, spaced-out soul and pre-mainstream disco."

Discography
 Asha Puthli (CBS, 1973)
 She Loves to Hear the Music (CBS, 1975)
 The Devil Is Loose (CBS, 1976)
 L'Indiana (CBS, 1978)
 1001 Nights of Love (Autobahn/Philips 1979)
 I'm Gonna Kill It Tonight (Autobahn 1980)
 Only the Headaches Remain (Woorell 1982)
Hari Om (Sony 1990)
 Lost (Kyrone 2009 )
 ‘’Je crois c’est ca l’amour’’ (MKMM 2021)

As guest
 Science Fiction, Ornette Coleman (Columbia, 1971)
 Mirror, Charlie Mariano (Atlantic, 1972)
 Squadra Antigangsters (Cinevox, 1979)
 Easily Slip Into Another World, Henry Threadgill (Novus, 1989)
 Export Quality, Dum Dum Project (Times Square/Groovy, 2001)
 Mpath - Wanderer, Gardner Cole (Triloka, 2003)
 Accerezzami, Fausto Papetti (2003)
 Asana Vol 3: Peaceful Heart, Bill Laswell (Meta, 2003)
 Fear of Magnetism, Stratus (Klein, 2005)
 Asana OHM Shanti, Bill Laswell (Meta, 2006)
 Asha's Kiss,  Raveena (Asha's Awakening, 2022)

References

External links

 Official Site

American actresses of Indian descent
American actresses
American electronic musicians
American musicians of Indian descent
American women musicians of Indian descent
American women singer-songwriters
American jazz singers
American singer-songwriters
Indian emigrants to the United States
Living people
Maharaja Sayajirao University of Baroda alumni
1945 births
American women in electronic music
Singers from Mumbai
Women musicians from Maharashtra
American Hindus
21st-century American women